Nice 'n' Greasy is the fifth studio album by British rock band Atomic Rooster.

In the US, the record was issued on Elektra in a different sleeve (pictured) to most territories and retitled Atomic Rooster IV, as their first album, Atomic Roooster (1970), failed to secure a US release. The US album also had a somewhat different track list to the UK version. The German release Nice & Greasy followed the US track listing, but with a phallic art sleeve. It was further reissued in Germany in 1977, this time in yet another new sleeve and retitled This is Atomic Rooster Vol. 2.

Track listing

Original UK version 
Side one
 "All Across the Country" (Vincent Crane) – 5:10
 "Save Me" (Crane) – 3:14 re-recorded, retitled version of "Friday the 13th"
 "Voodoo in You" (Jackie Avery) – 7:04
 "Goodbye Planet Earth" (Johnny Mandala) – 4:09
Side two
 "Take One Toke" (Crane) – 4:59
 "Can't Find a Reason" (Crane) – 4:34
 "Ear in the Snow" (Crane) – 6:13
 "Satan's Wheel" (Crane) – 6:39

2004 Castle Music CD reissue bonus tracks 
  "What You Gonna Do?" (Farlowe) – 5:23
 "Moods" (Crane) – 4:20 "Can't Find a Reason" single B-side
 "The Devil's Answer" (John Du Cann) – 4:09 live in Milan 1981
 "Throw Your Life Away" (Crane, Du Cann) – 2:49 "Do You Know Who’s Looking for You?" single B-side 1980

Original US / German version 
Side one
 "All Across the Country" (Vincent Crane) – 5:10
 "Save Me" aka "Friday the 13th" (Crane) – 3:14
 "Voodoo in You" (Jackie Avery) – 7:04
 "Moods" (Crane) – 4:20
Side two
 "Take One Toke" (Crane) – 4:59
 "Can't Find a Reason" (Crane) – 4:34
 "Ear in the Snow" (Crane) – 6:13
 "What You Gonna Do" (Chris Farlowe) – 5:23

Personnel 
Atomic Rooster
 Chris Farlowe – vocals
 Vincent Crane – Hammond organ, piano, ARP synthesizer, keyboard bass
 John Goodsall (under the pseudonym Johnny Mandala) – guitars
 Ric Parnell – drums, percussion

References

Further reading 
 The New Musical Express Book of Rock, 1975, Star Books,

External links 
 Atomic Rooster - Nice 'n' Greasy (1973) album review by Robert Taylor, credits & releases at AllMusic
 Atomic Rooster - Nice 'n' Greasy (1973, UK release) album releases & credits at Discogs.com
 Atomic Rooster - IV (1973, US release) album releases & credits at Discogs.com
 Atomic Rooster - Nice & Greasy (1973, German release) album releases & credits at Discogs.com
 Atomic Rooster - Nice 'n' Greasy (1973) album credits & user reviews at ProgArchives.com
 Atomic Rooster - Nice 'n' Greasy (1973) album to be listened as stream at Spotify.com

Atomic Rooster albums
1973 albums
Elektra Records albums
Dawn Records albums
Brain Records albums
Repertoire Records albums
Sequel Records albums
Castle Communications albums
Albums recorded at Trident Studios